The Radio Chick is the on-air name for Leslie Gold, an American radio personality whose talk show features comedian Chuck Nice and her producer, Paul "Butch" Brennan. Leslie is a recurring guest host on the Fox News Radio Network heard nationally. She is the Executive Producer of "The Gong Show Live - Off Broadway", a theatrical recreation of the classic TV show. She is a graduate of Syracuse University and The Harvard Business School.

Broadcasting history
In 1999, Gold was one of the first hosts on NYC station WNEW-FM's hot talk format change. Gold and Brennan staged a well publicized attack on Kathie Lee Gifford while Gifford was substitute hosting for David Letterman.  The attack was aired on TV. "The Radiochick" show became a hit shortly thereafter, but despite the strong ratings Gold and her team were fired toward the end of 2000. A write-in campaign by thousands of listeners to the CBS corporate headquarters got the show reinstated on the air, but Gold later lost her position when WNEW changed its format from talk to Hot AC. She quickly rebounded and began hosting the morning show on WAXQ, a classic rock station. At that time, Gold was the only woman headlining a morning radio show in NYC. Again, however, this did not last and Gold moved "The Radio Chick" to satellite radio. Her show was heard on Sirius Satellite radio in 2004 and 2005 on the "Sirius Stars" channel. In 2006 Gold returned to New York radio and became the afternoon drive time host for WFNY's Free FM talk format.

On May 24, 2007, Gold announced that due to WFNY's return to the K-Rock format and WXRK call letters, she was no longer going to air her show on the station. She has announced that she is currently associated with the 2008 version of The Gong Show on Comedy Central.  In addition she has been slated to host the television pilot TMI which stands for "Too Much Information."

On March 20, 2009, The Radio Chick announced on her website that she would be doing her show via podcasts or ChickCasts as she calls them.  Chickcasting began on  Wednesday, March 25, 2009. More information can be found on her official website, and the podcasts are available on iTunes. 
Leslie has also been hired as a public speaker, speaking to executives, women's groups and college students on a variety of topics.  Recent engagements have included Morgan Stanley, Eisner LLP, Panasonic, The Women's Financial Group.

Gold broadcast at Shovio's Talk Back TV, a revolutionary technology in broadcasting. Gold guest hosts on Fox News Radio and appears as a commentator from time to time on the Fox News Channel.  Gold lives in New York City with rock drummer Carmine Appice.

The Radiochick Corporation has been awarded the rights to stage The Gong Show Live in venues throughout the U.S., the first being August 12, 2010 at B.B. King's Blues Club in NYC. The Gong Show Live is in residence at The Cutting Room in NYC.

References
Radio Chick podcast announcement
news article Radiochick leaves terrestrial for sirius 
Radionewsweb Radiochick billboard upsets Clear channel
UPN 9 News Coverage of Billboard controversy

Notes

External links
The Radio Chick's Official Website

American talk radio hosts
American women radio presenters
Harvard Business School alumni
Radio personalities from New York City
Syracuse University alumni
Year of birth missing (living people)
Living people